Yuri Koksharov (born October 1, 1985) is a Russian professional ice hockey centre who currently plays for Arlan Kokshetau in the Kazakhstan Hockey League. He previously played four seasons with HC Vityaz of the Kontinental Hockey League (KHL).

References

External links

Living people
Amur Khabarovsk players
Metallurg Novokuznetsk players
Zauralie Kurgan players
HC Vityaz players
1985 births
Russian ice hockey centres